Sir  Gobardhan (or Seer Goverdhanpur) is a census town in Varanasi tehsil of Varanasi district in the Indian state of Uttar Pradesh. The census town & village falls under the Shir Goverdhanpur gram panchayat. Sir Gobardhan Census  town & village is about 13 kilometers South of Varanasi railway station, 323 kilometers South-East of  Lucknow and 3.5 kilometers South-East of Banaras Hindu University  main gate. It is of historical significance as it is birthplace of Sant Sri Guru Ravidas. Shri Guru Ravidass Janam Asthan at Seer Goverdhanpur is main pilgrimage place for Ravidasis worldwide.

Demography
Sir  Gobardhan has  families with a total  population of 11,350. Sex ratio of the census town is 875 and child sex ratio is 914. Uttar Pradesh state  average for both ratios is 912 and 902 respectively.

Transportation
Sir  Gobardhan is connected by air (Lal Bahadur Shastri Airport), by train  (Varanasi City railway station) and by road. Nearest operational airports  is Lal Bahadur Shastri Airport and nearest operational railway station is  Varanasi City railway station (40 and 13 kilometers respectively from Sir  Gobardhan).

See also
 Varanasi Cantt.
 Varanasi (Lok Sabha constituency)

Notes

  All  demographic data is based on 2011 Census of India.

References 

Census towns in Varanasi district
Cities and towns in Varanasi district